The administrative division reform of 1708 was carried out by Russian Tsar Peter the Great in an attempt to improve the manageability of the vast territory of Russia. Prior to the reform, the country was subdivided into uyezds and volosts, and in the 17th century the number of the uyezds was 166.

Creation
On , 1708, Peter issued an edict dividing Russia into eight governorates (guberniyas). The edict established neither the borders of the governorates nor their internal divisions; instead, their territories were defined as the sets of cities and the lands adjacent to those cities. Some older subdivision types also continued to be used.

List of the governorates created in 1708

References

1708-1710
1700s in Russia
1710 in Russia